is a Japanese manufacturer of high-end, premium radio-controlled cars based in Funabashi, Chiba, Japan. Mugen means unlimited, Seiki means machinery works. Mugen Seiki currently manufactures a 1/8 scale buggy and truggy as well as a 1/8 scale pan car and 1/10 scale touring car. Mugen Seiki's biggest competitors include: Kyosho and Serpent.

In 1990, Mugen Seiki launched its first offroad car, the Supersport. Production ran till 1992. The stadium truck later replaced the Supersport and then the Supersport was succeeded by a stadium truck. The stadium truck was based on the platform used in the Supersport. Mugen later made a return to 1/8 scale buggy segment with a model called the “Super Athlete.”

MBX Series

MBX-4
In 1999 Mugen Seiki's 4th generation off-road vehicle made its first major race at the 1999 EFRA 1/8 Off-Road European Championship in Spain. The car was called the MBX-4 and was an all new 1/8 buggy.

MBX-4XR WORKS
The MBX-4XR WORKS was a special version of the MBX-4 and was announced on December 1, 2000. Mugen called it their "Expert Model."

MBX-4R
The MBX-4R was a revised version of the MBX-4 and had updated suspension, an arms and steering.

MBX-5 & MBX-5T
After a near 4 year production run of the MBX-4 (with updates in between), in mid-2003 the MBX-5 was launched. The car had won a world championship and was in production through 2006.

MBX-5 Pro Spec
The MBX-5 Pro Spec was an updated version of the MBX-5. It featured thicker shock towers, aluminum rear uprights, aluminum steering arm, front and rear chassis braces and titanium turn buckles. This was the first Mugen buggy to feature chassis braces.

MBX-5R
The MBX-5R was a newer and revised version of the MBX-5 Pro Spec. Compared to its predecessor (the MBX-5 Pro Spec) it featured longer travel suspension, a new one-piece engine mount and more steering travel.

MBX-6 & MBX-6T 
The MBX-6 and MBX-6T succeeded the MBX-5 and its truggy counterpart in 2008 and featured all new 15mm diameter big bore shocks and thicker shock towers.  It was an all new car and was redone so heavily it was nearly unrecognizable compared to its MBX-5 predecessor.

MBX-6 ECO
The MBX-6 ECO was an electric version of the Mugen MBX-6.

MBX-6R/ R ECO

MBX-6 USA Race Edition/USA Race Edition ECO
The MBX-6 Race Editions distinguished themselves with silver colored graphite parts. The graphite parts used included the top steering plate, shock towers, and front steering fins.

MBX7T & MBX7TE (ECO) The truggy version of the MBX7 was launched in May 2014, to succeed the MBX6TR. It was the first time the truggy was available in electric form right out of the box. It featured a host of shock updates including longer travel suspension.

MBX-7R & MBX-7TR ECO

Current Models

MBX7R
The 7R features a revised chassis and control arm setup along with new 16 mm big bore shocks. The rear shocks had a shorter stroke by 4 mm compared to its predecessor. MBX-7R The vehicle was released in December 2014.

MBX7TR & MBX7TR ECO. The MBX7TR along with the MBX7TR ECO were officially launched November 3, 2015 despite already have competing in a number of prior R/C car races. The new car features 16mm shocks which are up from the previous 15mm shocks used in the MBX7T, as well as a stiffer chassis and more precise steering with an improved servo saver. Other revisions to the MBX7TR truggy include a new 1.4mm spring which is lighter and designed to help reduce chassis roll and improve handling on bumpy track conditions. The front lower arms have been revised with more material added to the area surrounding the hinge pin for increased durability. The MBX7TR also abandoned the rebuild-able CVD style shafts in favor of universal style driveshafts and now also shares the same trailing style front hub carrier and ackermann plate as the MBX7R buggy. The front steering and geometry changes are intended to increase the truck's steering and the total number of steering adjustments available.

MBX8

The "MBX8" was introduced on 11/12/2017 on their Facebook page. Adam Drake says that the NEW MBX8 has a lot to offer!  More durable, more acceleration, more runtime, easier to work on, and lightweight.  The new Mugen Seiki MBX8 buggy has been put to the tested and develop by him and other best drivers in the world. 
 
Here's a look at some of the new features for the Mugen Seiki MBX8.

Chassis:
-The MBX8 chassis features a new design that improves traction and stability in bumpy conditions and on the exit of corners.  The steering post are also keyed into the MBX8 chassis for easier maintenance.   
 
Differential and drivetrain: 
-High Traction Differentials are included in the MBX8.  The Mugen Seiki HTD provides increased acceleration, longer runtime, and more consistent handling.  The HTD's also increase stability, traction and improve handling in bumpy conditions.  The HTD has a new larger volume diff cup to increase consistency during long main events.  This makes it easier to time rhythm sections, better in bumpy and low grip conditions, helps to increase traction, and increases fuel mileage. 
 
- New straight cut 13T bevel gear and 44T conical gear.
The new straight cut bevel and conical gears increase acceleration, runtime, and efficiency.    A free and efficient drivetrain will also increase speeds while cornering.

Lightweight one-piece wing mount.
-The new lightweight one-piece wing mount lower the center of gravity.  The position of the wing and wing mount is optimized to improve the performance of vehicle.  The height of the wing mount is adjustable.  This allows you to control the down force on the rear of the vehicle by simply raising or lowering the mount on the shock tower.

-Lightweight high down-force wing.
The new IFMAR legal wing is lightweight and provides amazing down force and corning.  The underside of the wing uses a new design to reduced weight and creates additional down-force.

References

External links
 For Vehicles Produced (Tab that says "Products") & For Headquarters (Tab that says "Company")
 MBX5 World Championships
 MBX4 Racing in Spain
 Mugen Launches new MBX-4XR
 MBX-5 VS MBX-5 Pro Spec VS MBX-5R
 MBX-6 ECO USA Race Edition Information
 http://www.rccaraction.com/blog/2014/04/11/two-popular-nitro-models-from-mugen-seiki-and-serpent-go-electric/
 
 

Model manufacturers of Japan
Radio-controlled car manufacturers
Toy cars and trucks
Manufacturing companies based in Tokyo
Toy companies established in 1988
1988 establishments in Japan
Toy companies of Japan